Billy Lee is a former Gaelic footballer and former manager of the Limerick county football team. He is from Newcastle West.

Player 
Lee played for Limerick. He became a selector when Liam Kearns managed the team between 1999 and 2005, and then was manager for six years. He won the McGrath Cup and won the National Football League Division 4 title. He got them promoted to Division Two where he left them with a place in the Sam Maguire Cup. He went out on a high when he led Limerick to a Munster Final in 2022. He beat Clare on penalties then sent off Tipperary at Semple Stadium, only for Kerry to send them into a last-12 outing with Cork, which they lost.  They were ranked 31st of 32 in 2018 and Lee was going to forfeit that year's championship. In his last year with Limerick, Lee was one of the longest serving inter-county managers on the circuit. He was part of the selection committee for a new manager and then the others asked him to do the job. He left his post in August 2022.

References

External links
 TOP 10 | Limerick's best performances under Billy Lee
 Limerick rise from darkness into light under Billy Lee

Year of birth missing (living people)
Gaelic football managers
Gaelic football selectors
Limerick inter-county Gaelic footballers
People from Newcastle West
Living people